Jeremy Daniel McKendrick Watson CBE FREng FIET is professor of Engineering Systems at University College London, UK. He was formerly president (2016–17) of the IET.

Early life
Watson studied Electronics at the University of London from 1972 - 1974. He was awarded a masters degree in Cybernetics in 1976. In 1982, he completed his PhD degree in Biomedical engineering from the University of Sussex, UK.

Career
Watson was BOC Edwards Technology Director, then Arup's Global Research Director and Chief Scientific Adviser (CSA) for the UK Department of Communities and Local Government (now DLUHC). He later joined UCL Faculty of Engineering Sciences where he is Professor of Engineering Systems. He works within the department of Science Technology Engineering and Public Policy (STEaPP). He was, until recently (08/21) the Chief Scientist & Engineer of BRE Group, UK. He is a member of the NPL Science and Technology Advisory Committee, and has been a visiting professor at Aston University, the University of Sussex and the University of Southampton, UK. Watson is the Director and Principal Investigator of the EPSRC-funded PETRAS National Centre of Excellence - a consortium of researchers from 24 universities working on making Internet of Things and Edge systems safe and secure. He is a fellow and recent trustee of the Royal Academy of Engineering, and was founding chair of the National Engineering Policy Centre committee.

Awards
Watson was elected to the Royal Academy of Engineering in 2010. He was awarded a CBE by the Queen for services to Engineering in 2013.

References

Living people
British engineers
Academics of the University of Southampton
Alumni of the University of Sussex
Commanders of the Order of the British Empire
Fellows of the Royal Academy of Engineering
Year of birth missing (living people)